James H. Birch may refer to:
 James H. Birch (slave trader) ( 1841), American slave trader
 James Harvey Birch (1804–1878), Missouri politician and judge